FC Energy Voronezh (Russian: «Энергия» Воронеж) was a women's football club from Voronezh, Russia.

The club holds the most championships in Russian, having 5 championships to its name. In 1994 the team won the vice championship behind CSK WWS Samara. From that time to 2004 when the club finished third, the team always achieved at least a second-place finish winning titles in 1995, 1997, 1998, 2002 and 2003.

History
Founded in 1989, Energiya started in the also newly founded Soviet Championship's second tier. In 1990 the club managed a mid-table 8th place, while in the next season it gained promotion to the new top division after winning its group and the subsequent playoffs against the other group winners. Following the dissolution of the Soviet Union Energiya was instead registered in the new Russian Championship.

Energiya, which was known in 2000 and 2001 as Energiya XXI Wiek Voronezh («Энергия XXI Век» Воронеж) for sponsorship reasons, soon became a national powerhouse; always ranking in the two top positions for a decade, it won five championships between 1995 and 2003. The club was even more successful in the national cup, with seven trophies between 1993 and 2001 including two three-years winning streaks. In 2004 and 2005 it also played the UEFA Women's Cup, where it reached the quarter-finals both times, losing to eventual champions Umeå IK and Turbine Potsdam.

This last European campaign marked the end of the club's golden era as it had to withdraw from the 2005 championship due to financial trouble, playing instead in the second tier. Energiya returned to the top category in 2008, losing all 16 games but avoiding relegation due to the dissolution of Nadezhda Noginsk and SKA Rostov. In 2009 it returned to the top positions, and in 2010 it qualified to the new UEFA Women's Champions League (where it was defeated in the Round of 16 by compatriot rival WFC Rossiyanka) by beating 2009 European runner-up Zvezda Perm in a last-week match for the second place. However the club's comeback was short-lived, as in June 2012 it again had to disband its squad and withdraw from the premier category for financial reasons.

Honours

Titles
 Russian Championship (5)
 1995, 1997, 1998, 2002, 2003
 Russian Cup (7)
 1993, 1995, 1996, 1997, 1999, 2000, 2001

Other results

Record in UEFA competitions

Former internationals
  Russia: Nadezhda Bosikova, Kristina Chichkala, Elena Danilova, Anastasia Kostyukova, Anna Kozhnikova, Elena Lamtyugina, Olesya Mashina, Oksana Ryabinicheva, Marina Saenko, Oksana Shmachkova, Vera Strukova, Elena Terekhova, Yulia Zapotichnaya
  Brazil: Simone Gomes
  Cameroon: Augustine Ejangue, Njoya Nkout
  Equatorial Guinea: Adriana Parente, Annette Jacky Messomo
  Italy: Pamela Conti
  Jamaica: Omolyn Davis
  Kazakhstan: Irina Saratovtseva
  Moldova: Elena Porosniuc
  Nigeria: Emueje Ogbiagbevha
  Spain: Verónica Boquete
  Ukraine: Yulia Emelyanova, Ludmila Pekur, Veronika Shulga, Iryna Zvarych
  United States: Jenny Benson

References
Notes

Citations

External links
 Club's website
 UEFA profile

Women's football clubs in Russia
Sport in Voronezh
1989 establishments in Russia
2012 disestablishments in Russia
Association football clubs established in 1989
Association football clubs disestablished in 2012
Defunct football clubs in Russia